Fort Gregg was a Confederate fort located near Petersburg, Virginia.

The battle for Fort Gregg occurred on April 2, 1865, as part of the Third Battle of Petersburg in Dinwiddie County near the outskirts of Petersburg.

References
 Fox, III, John J. The Confederate Alamo: Bloodbath at Petersburg's Fort Gregg on April 2, 1865. Winchester VA: Angle Valley Press, 2010. .

External links
Confederate Fort Gregg at the Historical Markers Database

Gregg
Buildings and structures in Dinwiddie County, Virginia
Virginia in the American Civil War